Adrian Tuohey (born 14 May 1993) is an Irish hurler who plays as a right corner-back for club side Beagh and at inter-county level with the Galway senior hurling team.

Playing career

Club

Tuohey joined the Beagh club at a young age and played in all grades at juvenile and underage levels before joining the club's top adult team.

Inter-county

Minor and under-21

Tuohey first played for Galway as a member of the minor hurling team on 23 July 2011. He made his first appearance in an 8-26 to 0-12 All-Ireland quarter-final defeat of Antrim at Parnell Park. On 4 September 2011, Tuohey was at right wing-back in Galway's 1-21 to 1-12 defeat of Dublin in the All-Ireland final at Croke Park.	

As a member of the Galway under-21 hurling team, Tuohey made his only appearance on 23 August 2014 in a 1-21 to 1-19 All-Ireland semi-final defeat by Wexford.

Intermediate

On 1 July 2015, Tuohey made his first appearance for the Galway intermediate hurling team. He later won a Leinster Championship medal following Galway's 1-20 to 0-11 defeat of Wexford in the final. On 8 August 2015, Tuoehy won an All-Ireland medal after Galway's 0-23 to 0-14 defeat of Cork in the final.

Senior

Tuohey made his first appearance for the Galway senior hurling team in a 1-27 to 1-21 National Hurling League defeat of Cork on 14 February 2016. He later made his championship debut on 5 June 2016 in a 3-27 to 0-19 defeat of Westmeath at Cusack Park.

On 23 April 2017, Tuohey was at right corner-back when Galway defeated Tipperary by 3-21 to 0-14 to win the National Hurling League. Later that season he won his first Leinster Championship medal after Galway's 0-29 to 1-17 defeat of Wexford in the final. Following Galway's All-Ireland semi-final defeat of Tipperary, there was speculation that Tuohey would receive some sanction from the CCCC after footage of him pulling the helmet from Tipperary player Patrick Maher’s head was shown on the Sunday Game. The incident wasn’t dealt with by referee Barry Kelly or his officials, however, the CCCC took no subsequent action. On 3 September 2017, Tuohey started for Galway at right corner-back when they won their first All-Ireland in 29 years after a 0-26 to 2-17 defeat of Waterford in the final. 

On 8 July 2018, Tuohey won a second successive Leinster Championship medal following Galway's 1-28 to 3-15 defeat of Kilkenny in the final. On 19 August 2018, he lined out at left corner-back in Galway's 3-16 to 2-18 All-Ireland final defeat by Limerick.

Career statistics

Honours

Galway
 All-Ireland Senior Hurling Championship (1): 2017 
Leinster Senior Hurling Championship (2): 2017, 2018
National Hurling League (2): 2017, 2021
All-Ireland Intermediate Hurling Championship (1): 2015
Leinster Intermediate Hurling Championship (1): 2015
All-Ireland Minor Hurling Championship (1): 2011

References

1993 births
Living people
Beagh hurlers
Galway inter-county hurlers